Cho Jun-hyuk (born 14 July 1960) is a South Korean politician and an advocate of the South Korean New Right political movement. He is currently the head of the conservative teachers' union, Union of Education Movement for Liberal Democracy (자유주의교육운동연합).

Controversy

Korean Teachers & Education Workers' Union Dispute
Cho Jun-hyuk published a list of teachers affiliated with the liberal Korean Teachers & Education Workers' Union on Donga Ilbo, a conservative Chojoongdong newspaper on 20 April 2010.

This later backfired. The KTU filed a court proposal to confiscate his assets in 2010. This problem has led to the Incheon District Court's decision to confiscate his political fundings and other government taxes.

Works
Cho, Jun-hyuk, 경제학으로 세상 바로보기, 해남 (8 October 2004),

As Co-author
Cho, Jun-hyuk & Hong, Jin-pyo 전교조 없는 세상에 살고 싶다, 기파랑 (21 November 2006),

See also
 New Right (South Korea)

References

External links
  Official Website
  Naver Blog
  Naver Profile

1960 births
Living people
Korea University alumni
University of Wisconsin–Madison alumni
Academic staff of Incheon National University
Academic staff of Myongji University